Jacob "Jaap" Rijks (25 August 1919 – 11 February 2017) was a Dutch equestrian who competed for his home nation in the 1948 Summer Olympics in London. He was born in Nijmegen.

References

1919 births
2017 deaths
Dutch male equestrians
Olympic equestrians of the Netherlands
Equestrians at the 1948 Summer Olympics
Sportspeople from Nijmegen